Rodney Bush is a South African former international footballer who played as a defender.

Player

Professional
Bush played mostly in his native country for East London Celtic (he was born and bred in East London) and later Moroka Swallows but also had spells with Scottish side Dundee United and the San Diego Sockers of the North American Soccer League. In his hey-day he was one of the best headers of the ball in South Africa.

International
Bush represented South Africa in 1977 versus Rhodesia.

Manager
In 1986, Bush became the player manager of the Moroka Swallows.

Honours

Moroka Swallows
 John Player Special Knockout Cup (Runner-up): 1
 1986

References

Living people
Sportspeople from East London, Eastern Cape
Arcadia Shepherds F.C. players
Dundee United F.C. players
Expatriate footballers in Scotland
South African expatriate sportspeople in Scotland
Association football wingers
Moroka Swallows F.C. players
North American Soccer League (1968–1984) players
San Diego Sockers (NASL) players
Scottish Football League players
South African expatriate soccer players
Expatriate soccer players in the United States
South African expatriate sportspeople in the United States
South African soccer players
South Africa international soccer players
White South African people
Bidvest Wits F.C. players
Cape Town City F.C. (NFL) players
1955 births
Rangers F.C. (South Africa) players
National Football League (South Africa) players
Soccer players from the Eastern Cape